Livaie is a former commune in the Orne department in north-western France. On 1 January 2019, it was merged into the new commune L'Orée-d'Écouves.

See also 

 Communes of the Orne department
 Parc naturel régional Normandie-Maine

References 

Former communes of Orne